was a Japanese sprinter at the 1936 Summer Olympics.

Aihara competed at the Olympics at the same time he was attending Chuo University in Tokyo. He joined the postal service after graduating.

Aihara competed in the men's 400 metres and the men's 4 x 400 metres relay events at the 1936 Summer Olympics. He competed in the Hakone Ekiden relay race in 1937 and won the 400 metre and the 400 metre hurdles events at the 1937 Japan Athletics Championships.

References

External links
 

1914 births
Year of death missing
Place of birth missing
Japanese male sprinters
Japanese male hurdlers
Olympic male sprinters
Olympic athletes of Japan
Athletes (track and field) at the 1936 Summer Olympics
Japan Championships in Athletics winners
20th-century Japanese people